Ancylopsetta dilecta, the three-eye flounder, is a species of large-tooth flounder found along the Atlantic and Caribbean coasts of North and Central America.

References
 

Paralichthyidae
Fish described in 1883